Christian Sommer Kindt (8 November 1815 – 1 March 1903) was a Norwegian physician and botanical collector born in the town of Risør. He was the father of physician Olaf Berg Kindt (1850–1935).

He studied medicine in Christiania, later serving as a physician at the Trondheim hospital. As a pastime, he collected lichen and algae. His collection can be found at the Videnskabsselskabets Museum in Oslo.

In 1884 he described the lichen species Microglaena nidarosiensis (synonym, Belonia nidarosiensis).

References 

1815 births
1903 deaths
People from Risør
University of Oslo alumni
19th-century Norwegian botanists